The Auranga River (localised name: Oranga River) flows through the Latehar and Palamu districts in the Indian state of Jharkhand.

Course
The Auranga originates near Soheda in a pass.

It passes through a large valley, the southern face of which is formed by the Kumandih hills. Its bed widens rapidly and by the time it reaches the Palamu Fort it has attained a considerable size. Where the ruins of these two forts overlook it, the channel is crowded with huge masses of gneiss. Owing to its rocky bed, navigation is impossible in the rains, and at other times the supply of water is insufficient for even the smallest craft.

Tributaries
Its principal tributaries are the Sukri and Ghaghri.

References

Rivers of Jharkhand
Rivers of India